The following is a list of notable deaths in October 2014.

Entries for each day are listed alphabetically by surname. A typical entry lists information in the following sequence:
Name, age, country of citizenship and reason for notability, established cause of death, reference.

October 2014

1
Michel Baranger, 87, Franco-American theoretical physicist.
Lynsey de Paul, 66, English singer-songwriter ("Sugar Me", "Won't Somebody Dance with Me"), brain haemorrhage.
Sir Maurice Hodgson, 94, British business executive.
Shlomo Lahat, 86, Israeli general and politician, Mayor of Tel Aviv (1974–1993), lung infection.
José Martínez, 72, Cuban baseball player (Pittsburgh Pirates), coach (Kansas City Royals, Chicago Cubs) and executive (Atlanta Braves).
Oluremi Oyo, 61, Nigerian journalist, cancer.
Charlie Paulk, 68, American basketball player (Milwaukee Bucks, New York Knicks), heart attack.
Matilde Pérez, 97, Chilean painter and kinetic artist.
Jerome Reppa, 89, American politician, member of the Indiana House of Representatives (1972–1990).
Hans Sauter, 89, Austrian Olympic gymnast.
George Savage, 72, British politician, MLA for Upper Bann (1998–2003, 2007–2011).
Robert Serra, 27, Venezuelan politician, MLA for Caracas, stabbed.
Guido van Gheluwe, 88, Belgian lawyer, founded Orde van den Prince.
Bob Young, 81, Scottish cricketer.

2
David Banfield, 81, British priest.
Fyodor Bogdanovsky, 84, Russian weightlifter, Olympic champion (1956).
André Buffière, 91, French Olympic basketball player (1948, 1952).
Priscilla Coolidge, 72–73, American recording artist, shot.
Bill Crane, 90, Australian footballer.
Harold "Deacon" Duvall, 97, American football coach.
Herbert Eiteljörge, 79, German football player.
Robert Flower, 59, Australian Hall of Fame VFL footballer (Melbourne).
Michael Goldberg, 55, American screenwriter (Cool Runnings, Snow Dogs, Little Giants), brain and sinus cancer.
Joanne M. Holden, 68, American nutritionist, cancer.
Vaughn O. Lang, 86, American Army lieutenant general.
György Lázár, 90, Hungarian politician, Chairman of the Council of Ministers (1975–1987).
Carlos Lopez, 25, American stunt performer (The Hunger Games: Catching Fire, Teenage Mutant Ninja Turtles, John Wick), fall.
N. Mahalingam, 91, Indian businessman.
Pedro Peña, 88, Spanish actor (Médico de familia), Alzheimer's disease.
Carolyn Rovee-Collier, 72, American professor of psychology, breast cancer and multiple sclerosis.
Yoshikazu Sakamoto, 87, Japanese political scientist, heart failure.
Fred Sommers, 91, American philosopher.
The Spaceape, 44, British poet and disc jockey, cancer.

3
Michael Allenby, 3rd Viscount Allenby, 83, British aristocrat and politician.
Peer Augustinski, 74, German actor and German-language dub artist (Robin Williams), complications from epilepsy.
Nati Cano, 81, Mexican-born American mariachi musician (Mariachi los Camperos), recipient of the National Heritage Fellowship (1990).
Comer Cottrell, 82, American businessman and baseball team part-owner (Texas Rangers).
Bill Fiore, 74, American actor (The Corner Bar).
'Elisiva Fusipala Vaha'i, 65, Tongan royal.
Ewen Gilmour, 51, New Zealand comedian.
Benedict Groeschel, 81, American Roman Catholic priest, author and television host, a founder of the Franciscan Friars of the Renewal.
Alan Henning, 47, British humanitarian aid worker and ISIS hostage, beheading. (death reported on this date)
Peter Knecht, 78, American defense attorney, cancer.
Jean-Jacques Marcel, 83, French footballer (Olympique de Marseille).
Kevin Metheny, 60, American radio executive (WNBC (AM), WGN (AM)), heart attack.
Ward Ruyslinck, 85, Belgian author, Alzheimer's disease.
Lori Sandri, 65, Brazilian football manager, brain tumor.
Christopher van Wyk, 57, South African writer.

4
Konrad Boehmer, 73, German-born Dutch composer and writer, stroke.
Hugo Carvana, 77, Brazilian actor (Entranced Earth, Antonio das Mortes) and director (Casa da Mãe Joana).
Fyodor Cherenkov, 55, Russian footballer (FC Spartak Moscow, Soviet national team).
Paul Revere Dick, 76, American musician, cancer.
Thom Dickerson, 65, American journalist.
Jean-Claude Duvalier, 63, Haitian politician, President (1971–1986), heart attack.
Judith Edelman, 91, American architect, heart attack.
Herman Mandui, 45, Papua New Guinean archaeologist.
Joan Molina, 73, Spanish actor (Doctor Mateo).
Suhailah Noah, 82, Malaysian public figure, Spouse of the Prime Minister of Malaysia (1977–1981), widow of Hussein Onn.
Gholamali Pouratayi, 73, Iranian musician.
Rajesh Sanghi, 42, Indian cricketer, heart attack.
William Shija, 67, Tanzanian politician, Secretary General of the Commonwealth Parliamentary Association (since 2007).
Silver Deputy, 29, Canadian Thoroughbred racehorse, euthanized.
Gertjie Williams, 73, South African cricketer.

5
John Best, 74, British-born American soccer player, coach and manager, lung infection.
Al Bruno, 87, American CFL player (Toronto Argonauts) and coach (Hamilton Tiger-Cats), heart failure.
Charlie Butler, 94, American basketball player.
David Chavchavadze, 90, British-born American author and CIA officer.
Andrea de Cesaris, 55, Italian racing driver (Formula One), traffic collision.
Brahm Dutt, 88, Indian politician.
Jimmy Feix, 83, American football player and coach.
Anna Maria Gherardi, 74, Italian actress and voice actress (Lost Love, Petomaniac).
Regis Groff, 79, American politician, member of the Colorado Senate (1974–1994).
Göte Hagström, 96, Swedish steeplechase runner, Olympic bronze medalist (1948).
Geoffrey Holder, 84, Trinidadian actor (Live and Let Die, Annie) and Tony-winning director (The Wiz), pneumonia.
Philip Howard, 80, British journalist (The Times).
Ike Jones, 84, American producer (A Man Called Adam) and actor (The Joe Louis Story, About Mrs. Leslie).
Yuri Lyubimov, 97, Russian stage actor and director, founder of the Taganka Theatre.
Anna Przybylska, 35, Polish actress, pancreatic cancer.
Ronnie Spafford, 86, British army officer and philatelist.
Jack Turner, 84, American basketball player (New York Knicks).
Misty Upham, 32, American actress (Frozen River, August: Osage County, Django Unchained), blunt force trauma.
Tsai Wan-tsai, 85, Taiwanese financier.
David Watson, 74, British-American actor (Beneath the Planet of the Apes), heart attack.

6
King Block, 85, American football player.
Veniamin Borisov, 79, Soviet Russian painter.
Vic Braden, 85, American tennis player and instructor (University of Toledo), heart attack.
Feridun Buğeker, 81, Turkish footballer.
Bill Campbell, 91, American sportscaster.
Philip J. Carroll, 76–77, American businessman.
Chen Chi-lu, 91, Taiwanese politician, historian and anthropologist, multiple organ failure.
Carlos César Delía, 91, Argentine equestrian and a brigade general.
Andrew Kerr, 80, British festival organiser (Glastonbury Festival).
Johnny Midnight, 73, Filipino radio and television host, prostate cancer.
Igor Mitoraj, 70, Polish sculptor.
Diane Nyland, 70, Canadian actress (The Trouble with Tracy), heart failure and COPD.
Mikhail Potylchak, 42, Russian footballer, suicide by hanging.
Marian Seldes, 86, American actress (A Delicate Balance, Affliction, August Rush), Alzheimer's disease.
Apiwan Wiriyachai, 65, Thai politician, lung cancer.
Serhiy Zakarlyuka, 38, Ukrainian football player (Dnipro, national team) and manager, traffic collision.

7
Lloyd J. Andrews, 94, American politician and businessman.
Walter Bockmayer, 66, German writer and film director, lung cancer.
Federico Boido, 75, Italian actor and stuntman (Ace High, Superfly T.N.T.).
Ugo Carrega, 79, Italian artist and poet.
Cigar, 24, American thoroughbred racehorse, complications of neck surgery for osteoarthritis.
Nuno Miguel Cerqueira Dias, 37, Portuguese swimmer.
Nika Kiladze, 25, Georgian footballer, traffic collision.
Richard Laws, 88, British zoologist, Director of the British Antarctic Survey (1973–1987), Master of St Edmund's College, Cambridge (1987–1996).
Siegfried Lenz, 88, German writer.
Angus Macleod, 63, British journalist and editor, cancer.
Paul Margulies, 79, American philosopher and advertising executive.
Nancy Merki, 88, American Olympic swimmer.
Amos Mkhari, South African footballer.
David Samuel, 92, British-Israeli scientist and peer.
Zilpha Keatley Snyder, 87, American writer (The Egypt Game), stroke.
Brad Stanius, 68, American politician, member of the Minnesota House of Representatives.
Soviet Star, 30, American Thoroughbred racehorse.
Ivor Wilks, 86, British historian.
Iva Withers, 97, Canadian-born American theatre actress and singer.

8
Aleksandra Andreevna Antonova, 92, Russian, Kildin Sámi teacher, writer, poet and translator.
Mark Bell, 43, British musician and house music producer (LFO), complications from surgery.
Gerardo Budowski, 89, German–Venezuelan chess master, natural causes.
Thomas Eric Duncan, 42, Liberian courier, first person diagnosed with Ebola in the United States, Ebola virus disease.
Dave Engellenner, 95, Australian footballer.
Shon Harris, 46, American author.
Morris Lurie, 75, Australian writer, cancer.
Abdul Matin, 87, Bangladeshi language activist (Bengali Language Movement).
Alden E. Matthews, 93, American missionary.
Harden M. McConnell, 87, American chemistry professor (Stanford University).
Angelo Mottola, 79, Italian Roman Catholic archbishop and diplomat.
Helmut Ruge, 74, German comedian, actor, and cabaret writer.
Jeen van den Berg, 86, Dutch Olympic speedskater (1956, 1960), winner of the Elfstedentocht (1954).
Mike Waugh, 58, American politician, member of the Pennsylvania State Senate (1998–2014), cancer.

9
Les Angell, 92, English cricketer (Somerset).
Henning Bjerregaard, 87, Danish footballer.
John Patrick Boles, 84, American Roman Catholic prelate, titular bishop of Nova Sparsa.
Boris Buzančić, 85, Croatian actor and politician.
Sir Sydney Chapman, 78, English politician and architect, MP for Birmingham Handsworth (1970–1974) and Chipping Barnet (1979–2005).
Jan Hooks, 57, American comedian and actress (Saturday Night Live, Designing Women, Batman Returns), cancer.
M. V. Kamath, 93, Indian journalist.
Ana Karić, 73, Croatian actress.
Carolyn Kizer, 89, American poet, Pulitzer Prize winner, complications of dementia.
Matthias Koehl, 79, American neo-Nazi.
Kim Koscki, 50, American stunt performer (The Mighty Ducks, Contact, Apollo 13), cardiac arrest.
Willy Matsanga, 45, Congolese politician.
Ray Metzker, 83, American photographer.
Peter A. Peyser, 93, American politician, member of the U.S. House for New York's 25th (1971–1973) and 23rd (1973–1977, 1979–1983) districts, Parkinson's disease.
Tony Priday, 92, English bridge player.
David Rayvern Allen, 76, English cricket historian, cancer.
Style Scott, 58, Jamaican reggae drummer.
Rita Shane, 78, American operatic soprano, pancreatic and liver cancer.
Paul Allen Simmons, 93, American federal judge, U.S. District Court Judge for the Western District of Pennsylvania (since 1978).
Robert Sproull, 96, American educator and physicist.
Sir Jocelyn Stevens, 82, English publishing executive.
Connell Thode, 103, New Zealand naval officer and yachtsman.
Victor Winding, 85, British actor (Doctor Who, Emmerdale).

10
Ivan Armstrong, 86, New Zealand field hockey player and coach, tennis umpire, and educator.
Prue Barron, 97, Scottish surgeon.
C. Curtis-Smith, 73, American composer and pianist.
Olav Dale, 55, Norwegian composer and jazz saxophonist.
Damiana Eugenio, 93, Filipino author and professor.
Valeri Karpov, 43, Russian Olympic ice hockey player (1994), world champion (1993), head injury.
Lari Ketner, 37, American basketball player (Chicago Bulls, Cleveland Cavaliers, Indiana Pacers), colon cancer.
Pavel Landovský, 78, Czech actor and dissident, heart attack.
Roy Law, 77, English footballer (Wimbledon).
Finn Lied, 98, Norwegian military researcher and politician.
Jonathan Mane-Wheoki, 70, New Zealand art historian, curator and academic, pancreatic cancer.
Geoff Miller, 72, Australian public servant.
Amildo Morales, 76, Guatemalan politician, MP for Jalapa (since 2012), attacked by a bull.
Ed Nimmervoll, 67, Australian music journalist and author, brain cancer.
Ichirō Satake, 86, Japanese mathematician, respiratory failure.
Marianne Sjöblom, 80, Finnish Olympic fencer (1952).
John Westcott, 93, British computer scientist.
Ernie Wiggs, 73, New Zealand rugby league player (Auckland, national team).
Anatoly Yagudaev, 79, Russian sculptor.

11
Abbas Ali, 94, Indian politician and independence activist.
Anita Cerquetti, 83, Italian soprano.
Tanhum Cohen-Mintz, 75, Israeli basketball player, cancer.
Elbert Drungo, 71, American football player (Houston Oilers, Buffalo Bills), cancer.
Walter Fitzgerald, 78, Canadian politician, Mayor of Halifax (1971–1974, 1994–1996), MLA for Halifax Chebucto (1974–1981).
Donald Gauf, 87, Canadian Olympic champion ice hockey player (1952).
Margaret Hillert, 94, American author.
Jazil, 11, American thoroughbred racehorse, injuries sustained in paddock accident.
Jason Jurman, 34, American actor (Law & Order: Special Victims Unit, Blue Bloods, Cougar Club).
Brian Lemon, 77, British jazz pianist.
Gary McLarty, 73, American stunt performer (The Terminator, Jurassic Park, Beverly Hills Cop), traffic collision.
Bob Orrison, 86, American stunt performer (Stargate, Road House, Speed), traffic collision.
Mats Rondin, 54, Swedish cellist and composer, heart attack.
Carmelo Simeone, 81, Argentine footballer (Vélez Sarsfield, Boca Juniors).
Bob Such, 70, Australian politician, member of the South Australian House of Assembly for Fisher (since 1989), brain tumour.

12
Jack A. Apsche, 67, American psychologist.
Cleo Baldon, 87,  American architect, landscape architect, and furniture designer.
Geoff Elliott, 83, British decathlete.
Tony Hibbert, 96, British army officer.
Louise Daniel Hutchinson, 86, American historian.
Aki Jones, 31, American football player (Washington Redskins), car accident.
Maurie Keane, 91, Australian politician, member of the New South Wales Legislative Assembly for Woronora (1973–1988).
Tommy Lewis, 83, American football player (University of Alabama, Ottawa Rough Riders).
Lojze Logar, 70, Slovene artist.
Tony Lynes, 85, British anti-poverty campaigner.
Ali Mazrui, 81, Kenyan professor and political writer.
Graham Miles, 73, English snooker player.
Hussein Mjalli, 77, Jordanian lawyer and politician, involved in legal defence of Saddam Hussein, Justice Minister (2011), heart attack.
Enrique Santiago Petracchi, 78, Argentine lawyer and judge, member of the Supreme Court (since 1983).
Emilio Picasso, 87, Italian physicist.
Robert Relf, 90, English political activist.
Roberto Telch, 70, Argentine footballer (San Lorenzo, national team), heart attack.

13
Sir John Bradfield, 89, British biologist and entrepreneur, founder of Cambridge Science Park.
Barrie Brown, 83, Australian footballer.
Antonio Cafiero, 92, Argentine politician, Governor of Buenos Aires (1987–1991), Senator (1993–2005), pneumonia.
Patricia Carson, 85, British historian and author.
Mario Mellado García, 98, Mexican politician, Governor of Puebla (1972). (death announced on this date)
Elizabeth Norment, 61, American actress (House of Cards, Party of Five, Doogie Howser, M.D.), cancer.
Agnes Owens, 88, Scottish author.
José Hernán Sánchez Porras, 70, Venezuelan Roman Catholic prelate, Bishop of Military Ordinariate (since 2001).
Mohammad Sarengat, 74, Indonesian sprinter, Asian Games champion (1962), complications from a stroke.
Pontus Segerström, 33, Swedish footballer (IF Brommapojkarna), cancer.
Kapil Krishna Thakur, 74, Indian politician, MP for Bangaon.
Deborah Warren, 55, Argentine actress, cancer.

14
Tamar Ariel, 25, Israeli Air Force navigator, freezing.
Art Best, 61, American football player (Chicago Bears).
Mary Downer, 89, Australian arts patron.
Eve Dutton, 86, Australian lecturer and politician.
Encke, 5, American-bred British-trained thoroughbred racehorse, euthanized.
Humberto Lara Gavidia, El Salvadoran baseball player.
Ted Gullicksen, 60–61, American social justice activist.
Doğan Güreş, 88, Turkish general and politician.
A. H. Halsey, 91, British sociologist.
Bertha George Harris, 101, American tribal elder and potter, was oldest member of the Catawba people.
Paul Hubbert, 78, American educator and politician.
Jean-Claude Lefebvre, 81, French cyclist.
Leonard Liggio, 81, American libertarian author.
Ron Loewinsohn, 76, American poet.
Oriel Malet, 91, British novelist.
Heidrun Mohr-Mayer, 73, German jeweller and philanthropist.
Paul Muenzer, 82, American school administrator and politician, Mayor of Naples, Florida (1992–1996), liver and pancreatic cancer.
Joe H. Mulholland, 80, American politician, Mississippi State Senator (1964–1968, 1976–1984), cancer.
Bob Neilson, 91, New Zealand rugby league player (West Coast, national team).
Paul J. Olscamp, 77, Canadian university administrator.
Isaiah "Ikey" Owens, 39, American keyboardist, heart attack.
Elizabeth Peña, 55, American actress (The Incredibles, Rush Hour, Jacob's Ladder), cirrhosis.
Hans Ernst Schneider, 87, Swiss Olympic sprinter.
John F. Stephenson, 77, Australian football player (Carlton), plane crash.
Dharmaraj Thapa, 92, Nepali folk singer.
Walter Victor, 97, American sports photographer.

15
Sir James Balderstone, 93, Australian businessman and company director.
João Corso, 86, Brazilian Roman Catholic prelate, Bishop of Campos (1990–1995).
Filipe Oliveira Dias, 50, Portuguese architect.
Marie Dubois, 77, French actress (Shoot the Piano Player, Jules and Jim, Monte Carlo or Bust!), multiple sclerosis.
James Semple Kerr, 82, Australian architectural historian.
Christian Kinck, 58, French Olympic weightlifter.
Mile Krajina, 90, Croatian gusle player.
José Refugio Mercado Díaz, 72, Mexican Roman Catholic prelate, Auxiliary Bishop of Tehuantepec (2003–2009).
Giovanni Reale, 83, Italian philosophy historian.
Giorgio Rebuffi, 85, Italian comic book artist (Tiramolla, Cucciolo).
Jiří Reynek, 85, Czech graphic artist, poet and translator.
William Ronan, 101, American public servant, first chairman of MTA.
Sabir Shaikh, 71, Indian politician.
Sir Christopher Staughton, 81, British jurist, Lord Justice of Appeal, President of the Court of Appeal of Gibraltar (2005–2006).
Robert Tiernan, 85, American politician, member of the U.S. House for Rhode Island's 2nd district (1967–1975).
Nobby Wirkowski, 88, American football player (Toronto Argonauts) and coach (York University).

16
Brian Bath, 67, South African cricketer.
Ioannis Charalambopoulos, 95, Greek army officer and politician, Deputy Prime Minister (1985–1988).
Laurence Clancy, 85, British aerodynamicist.
Patrick Paul D'Souza, 86, Indian Roman Catholic prelate, Bishop of Varanasi (1971–2007).
James E. Defebaugh, 87, American politician, member of the Michigan House of Representatives (1971–1982).
Ertuğrul Oğuz Fırat, 91, Turkish composer, painter, and poet.
Allen Forte, 87, American music theorist and musicologist.
Sumi Haru, 75, American actress (MASH), Interim President of the Screen Actors Guild (1995), emphysema.
Tim Hauser, 72, American musician (The Manhattan Transfer), cardiac arrest.
Seppo Kuusela, 80, Finnish basketball player.
David Shepherd Nivison, 91, American sinologist.
Shalom Schwarz, 63, Israeli footballer.
John Spencer-Churchill, 11th Duke of Marlborough, 88, British peer, custodian of Blenheim Palace.

17
Shobha Abhyankar, 68, Indian musicologist and teacher, cancer.
John Andrew, 83, British-born American Anglican priest.
Edwards Barham, 77, American politician, Louisiana State Senator (1976–1980), plane crash.
Gero Bisanz, 78, German football player and coach.
Claude Brodin, 80, French Olympic fencer (1964).
Robert Donald Cohen, 81,  British physician.
Alfred Croisetière, 92, Canadian politician.
Bill Diachuk, 85, Canadian politician, MLA (1971–1986).
Arif Doğan, 68–69, Turkish officer.
Masaru Emoto, 71, Japanese author.
Hermione Hobhouse, 80, British architectural historian.
Joseph Hogan, 77, American politician, member of the Nevada Assembly (since 2005).
Vladimír Hrivnák, 69, Slovak football player and manager.
Leigh Kamman, 92, American radio host.
José Luis Lobato, 76, Mexican politician, Senator for Veracruz (2006–2012), shot.
G. Dean Loucks, 79, American college football coach (Fordham Rams).
Mikhail Marynich, 74, Belarusian politician.
Anna Nakagawa, 49, Japanese actress (A Sign Days, Godzilla vs. King Ghidorah), uterine cancer.
Daisuke Oku, 38, Japanese footballer (Júbilo Iwata, Yokohama F. Marinos), traffic collision.
Lawrence J. Quirk, 91, American writer, Hollywood reporter and film historian.
Jon Ramstad, 89, Norwegian politician.
Tom Shaw, 69, American Episcopal prelate, Bishop of Massachusetts (1995–2014), brain cancer.
Berndt von Staden, 95, German diplomat, Ambassador to the United States (1973–1979).

18
Robin Barbour, 93, Scottish minister and author.
Joanne Borgella, 32, American singer (American Idol) and model (Mo'Nique's Fat Chance), endometrial cancer.
Ralph Churches, 96, Australian soldier.
Paul Craft, 76, American musician and songwriter ("Brother Jukebox").
Choi Soon-dal, 83, South Korean scientist.
Eduardo D'Angelo, 75, Uruguayan actor, comedian and impressionist.
Jimmy Docherty, 83, Scottish rugby footballer.
Efua Dorkenoo, 65, Ghanaian-born British campaigner against female genital mutilation, cancer.
Sir Peter Downward, 90, British army general.
Luigi Gnocchi, 81, Italian Olympic sprinter.
Kenneth House, 78, English cricketer (Dorset).
Danny Light, 66, English footballer (Crystal Palace, Colchester United).
Lou Lucier, 96, American baseball player (Boston Red Sox, Philadelphia Phillies).
Rachel Makinson, 97, Australian research scientist.
R. C. Mehta, 96, Indian musician and musicologist.
Claude Ollier, 91, French nouveau roman author.
Bruce Phillips, 85, Australian football player (St Kilda).
Rick S. Piltz, 71, American climate analyst, metastasized liver cancer.
Edward Regan, 84, American politician, New York State Comptroller (1979–1993).
Mariano Lebrón Saviñón, 92, Dominican author and academic.
Sidney Shapiro, 98, American-born Chinese author and translator.
Melford Spiro, 94, American cultural anthropologist.
Rebel Steiner, 87, American football player (Green Bay Packers).
Veandercross, 26, New Zealand Thoroughbred horse.
Paul Henry Walsh, 77, American Roman Catholic prelate, Auxiliary Bishop of Rockville Centre (2003–2012).
Mervyn Winfield, 81, English cricketer (Nottinghamshire).

19
A.F. Salahuddin Ahmed, 90, Bangladeshi historian.
Horst Arndt, 80, German Olympic silver medallist rower (1956).
Frank Barnes, 88, American Major League Baseball player.
William Barrington-Coupe, 83, Welsh record producer.
Lynda Bellingham, 66, Canadian-born British actress (Doctor Who, General Hospital, The Bill), colon cancer.
Gloria Casarez, 42, American civil rights activist, cancer.
Kathryn Chaloner, 60, British-born American statistician, Professor of Biostatistics (University of Iowa).
Leonore Davidoff, 82, American historian.
Edward Donno, 79, American stunt performer (Daredevil, The Untouchables, Star Trek).
Stuart Gallacher, 68, Welsh rugby player (national union and league teams) and executive.
John Holt, 67, Jamaican singer (The Paragons) and songwriter ("The Tide Is High"), cancer.
Ed Keegan, 75, American baseball player (Philadelphia Phillies, Kansas City Athletics).
James Levesque, 52, American bassist (Agent Orange).
Arnold Mitchell, 84, English footballer (Exeter City).
Étienne Mourrut, 74, French politician, MP for Gard's 2nd constituency (2002–2012), Mayor of Le Grau-du-Roi (1983–2014).
Francis Nkwain, 84, Cameroonian senator.
Gerard Parkes, 90, Irish-born Canadian actor (Fraggle Rock, The Boondock Saints).
Stephen Paulus, 65, American composer, complications from a stroke.
Imre Pichler, 67, Hungarian politician, MP for Szigetvár.
Don Ratcliffe, 79, English footballer (Stoke City).
Raphael Ravenscroft, 60, British saxophonist ("Baker Street") and author, suspected heart attack.
Miloslava Rezková, 64, Czech high jumper, Olympic champion (1968).
Jim Sharkey, 80, Scottish footballer (Celtic).
Serena Shim, 30, Lebanese-born American journalist (Press TV), traffic collision.
Ken Short, 87, Australian Anglican prelate, Assistant Bishop of Sydney.
Bob Spear, 94, American naturalist, founder of Birds of Vermont Museum.

20
Ox Baker, 80, American professional wrestler and actor (Escape from New York), heart attack.
Gilbert Baumslag, 81, American mathematician.
Raymond Beadle, 70, American Hall of Fame drag racer, heart attack.
Dennis Biodrowski, 74, American football player (Kansas City Chiefs).
Gerd Bonk, 63, German weightlifter, Olympic bronze (1972) and silver (1976) medalist.
René Burri, 81, Swiss photographer, cancer.
Lilli Carati, 58, Italian actress (Being Twenty, La compagna di banco), brain tumor.
L. M. Kit Carson, 73, American screenwriter and actor (Paris, Texas, Running on Empty).
Peter Daland, 93, American swimming coach (University of Southern California, 1964 Olympic women, 1972 Olympic men).
Bob Dawson, 90, American television personality, meteorologist, and producer.
Jim Dunegan, 67, American baseball player (Chicago Cubs).
Robert Kevin Ellis, 60, British millionaire businessman, slashed.
Rodney Fitch, 76, English designer, cancer.
Sir John Hoskyns, 87, British businessman, policy advisor to Margaret Thatcher.
Rajam Krishnan, 89, Indian writer.
Ursula Lingen, 86, Austrian actress (The Model Husband).
Pete Livermore, 73, American politician, member of the Nevada Assembly (since 2011), heart attack.
David Malcolm, 76, Australian judge, Chief Justice of Western Australia (1988–2006).
Christophe de Margerie, 63, French businessman, CEO of Total S.A. (since 2007), plane crash.
Pavle Merkù, 87, Slovene composer.
Gary Plauché, 68, American vigilante murderer, stroke.
Oscar de la Renta, 82, Dominican fashion designer, cancer.
Tom Slade Jr., 78, American lobbyist, Chairman of the Republican Party of Florida (1993–1999), member of the Florida Legislature, heart failure.
John Solomon, 82, English croquet player.
Arthur Trestrail, 93, Trinidadian cricketer.

21
Jim Barrett, Jr., 83, English footballer (West Ham).
Sushil Biswas, Indian politician.
Ben Bradlee, 93, American journalist, Executive Editor of The Washington Post (1968–1991), Alzheimer's disease.
Otto Brolo, 85, Guatemalan sports shooter.
*Chen Ziming, 62, Chinese democracy activist, pancreatic cancer.
Johnny Lee Clary, 55, American professional wrestler, preacher and reformed Ku Klux Klan leader.
Roger Darvell, 83, English footballer, stroke.
Dale Dorman, 71, American radio disc jockey (WODS).
Laurențiu Dumănoiu, 63, Romanian volleyball player.
Seth Gaaikema, 75, Dutch comedian and writer, heart failure.
Nelson Bunker Hunt, 88, American oil company executive, cancer and dementia.
Mohammad-Reza Mahdavi Kani, 83, Iranian politician, Acting Prime Minister (1981), Minister of Interior (1980–1981), heart failure.
George Kline, 93, American translator and philosopher.
Yasumasa Narasaki, 86, Japanese politician, member of the House of Councilors (1992–1998), pneumonia.
Jean Packard, 91, American politician.
Tuna Scanlan, 80, Samoan boxer.
Rudolf Schmid, 63, Austrian luger, Olympic bronze medalist (1976), traffic collision.
Peter Trotter, 58, Australian Paralympic wheelchair racer.
Gough Whitlam, 98, Australian politician, Prime Minister (1972–1975).
Catherine Mary Wisnicki, 95, Canadian architect.

22
Murad Ashurly, 41, Azerbaijani mountaineer, fall from mountain.
Gert Boshoff, 83, South African Army general.
Martin Chalmers, 65, British translator.
Anatoly Chertkov, 78, Russian footballer.
Rhiannon Davies Jones, 92, Welsh novelist.
Elizabeth Forbes, 90, British writer and musicologist.
George Francis, 80, English footballer (Brentford).
John-Roger Hinkins, 80, American author and public speaker, founder of the Movement of Spiritual Inner Awareness.
Ashok Kumar, 72, Indian cinematographer and film director (Abhinandana).
Barry McSweeney, Irish scientist, Chief Science Advisor (2004–2005).
Paul Nabor, 86, Belizean musician.
John Postgate, 93, British microbiologist and writer, professor at University of Sussex.
David Redfern, 78, English photographer, cancer.
Sonia Rolt, 95, British canal conservationist.
Rinnat Safin, 74, Soviet biathlete, Olympic champion (1972).

23
Ghulam Azam, 91, Bangladeshi convicted war criminal, Emir of Jamaat-e-Islami (1969–2000), stroke.
Jeanne Black, 76, American country singer.
John Bramlett, 73, American football player (Boston Patriots).
Clarence Addison Brimmer, Jr., 92, American federal judge, Wyoming Attorney General (1971–1974).
Robert C. Calfee, 81, American educational psychologist, stomach cancer.
Spanky Davis, 71, American jazz trumpeter.
Sir Ronald Grierson, 93, British banker.
Göran Johansson, 69, Swedish politician and union leader, Chairman of the Gothenburg Municipality Executive Board (1988–1991, 1994–2009), cancer.
Terry Keenan, 53, American financial news anchor and journalist (CNN, FNC, New York Post), cerebral hemorrhage.
Frederic S. Lee, 64, American economist.
Clyde T. Lusk, 81, American coast guard officer, Vice Commandant of the United States Coast Guard (1988–1990).
Frank Mankiewicz, 90, American journalist and political adviser, press secretary to Robert F. Kennedy.
Bernard Mayes, 85, British-born American broadcaster and academic.
André Piters, 83, Belgian footballer (Standard Liège).
Joan Quigley, 87, American astrologer.
Tullio Regge, 83, Italian theoretical physicist.
Denma Locho Rinpoche, 86, Tibetan lama.
Alvin Stardust, 72, English singer ("My Coo Ca Choo").
Raleigh Trevelyan, 91, British author.

24
Esmeralda Agoglia, 91, Argentine prima ballerina and choreographer.
Alagappa Alagappan, 88, Indian-born American official.
Lorenzo Albacete, 73, American theologian and Roman Catholic priest.
Kim Anderzon, 71, Swedish film and theatre actress (Göta kanal eller Vem drog ur proppen?, Rederiet), spinal cancer.
Vic Ash, 84, English jazz saxophonist and clarinetist.
Joseph Battisto, 83, American politician.
Ted Beniades, 91, American actor (Scarface, Serpico, The Jackie Gleason Show).
Robert Brink, 90, American violinist, conductor, and educator.
Jacksel M. Broughton, 89, American air force officer and fighter pilot.
Reuben Cohen, 93, Canadian lawyer, Chancellor of Dalhousie University (1990–1994).
Mike Dorsey, 84, English-born Australian actor (Number 96).
Allison J. Doupe, 60, Canadian neuroscientist, cancer.
Martin Garratt, 34, English footballer (York City).
James F. Hastings, 88, American politician.
Shirley Hooper, 78, American politician, Secretary of State of New Mexico (1979–1982).
Gajanan Kathaley, 67, Indian cricketer.
Gordon MacWilliam, 91, British Anglican priest.
Pat McGlothin, 93, American baseball player (Brooklyn Dodgers).
Mbulaeni Mulaudzi, 34, South African middle-distance runner, Olympic silver medalist (2004), traffic collision.
S. S. Rajendran, 86, Indian actor, lung infection.
Creighton Leland Robertson, 70, American prelate, Episcopal Bishop of South Dakota.
Emily Ruto, 25, Kenyan cricketer (national women's team), leukemia.
Marcia Strassman, 66, American actress (Welcome Back, Kotter, Honey, I Shrunk the Kids, M*A*S*H) and singer, breast cancer.
Malcolm Thompson, 68, English footballer (Scarborough).
Tugela, 19, American-born Australian thoroughbred horse.

25
Radmilo Bogdanović, 80, Serbian politician.
Jack Bruce, 71, Scottish bassist (Cream, Manfred Mann) and composer, liver disease.
Gerry Burrell, 90, Scottish football player.
Jean-Michel Coulon, 94, French painter.
Oliver S. Crosby, 94, American diplomat.
Buzz Emick, 75, American attorney and politician.
Zbigniew Hnatio, 61, Polish footballer 
Ari Hoogenboom, 86, American historian.
Peter Baptist Tadamaro Ishigami, 93, Japanese Roman Catholic prelate, Bishop of Naha (1972–1997).
Reyhaneh Jabbari, 26, Iranian convicted murderer, subject of international campaign against her execution, execution by hanging.
Peter Maxey, 83, British diplomat, Ambassador to the United Nations (1984–1986).
Carlos Morales Troncoso, 74, Dominican politician, Vice President (1986–1994), Secretary of Foreign Affairs (1994–1996, 2004–2014), leukemia.
Sheila Shulman, 77, American-born British rabbi.
David Somerset, 84, British banker, Chief Cashier of the Bank of England (1980–1988).
Jim Stangeland, 92, American football player and coach.

26
Genpei Akasegawa, 77, Japanese author and artist, sepsis.
Jamil Alibekov, 86, Azerbaijani writer and public figure.
Vic Allen, 91, British academic, sociologist, historian and trade unionist (National Union of Mineworkers).
David Armstrong, 60, American photographer, liver cancer.
Françoise Bertin, 89, French actress.
Mo Collins, 38, American football player (Oakland Raiders), kidney failure.
Katrina Edwards, 46, American geomicrobiologist.
Rémi Fraisse, 21, French botanist, hit by stun grenade.
Germain Gagnon, 71, Canadian ice hockey player (Chicago Blackhawks, Montreal Canadiens, New York Islanders).
 Michael Hawkins, 86, British actor (The Hound of the Baskervilles, Doctor Who).
Dudley Knowles, 67, British philosopher, cancer.
Rod Love, 61, Canadian political strategist, cancer.
Senzo Meyiwa, 27, South African footballer (Orlando Pirates, national team), shot.
Brian Moore, 70, Australian rugby league player (Newtown Jets).
Hisahiko Okazaki, 84, Japanese diplomat and political commentator.
Oscar Orefici, 68, Italian journalist and writer.
*Manuel Revollo Crespo, 89, Bolivian Roman Catholic prelate, Bishop of Bolivian Military (2000–2012).
Jeff Robinson, 52, American baseball player (Detroit Tigers).
Gavin Smith, 59, American film studio executive, missing since 2012. (body discovered on this date)
Gordy Soltau, 89, American football player (San Francisco 49ers).
Oscar Taveras, 22, Dominican baseball player (St. Louis Cardinals), traffic collision.
Antonio Terenghi, 92, Italian comic book artist (Pedrito el Drito, Tarzanetto).
Sir Tay Wilson, 89, New Zealand sports official.
Bob Wood, 93, American basketball player (Sheboygan Red Skins).

27
Ron Adam, 80, Canadian football player (Saskatchewan Roughriders).
Daniel Boulanger, 92, French actor and screenwriter.
Norman Hansen, 90, American public official, Town Manager of Saugus, Massachusetts (1987–1992).
Bob Kenney, 83, American basketball player, Olympic champion (1952).
Doug Laing, 83, Australian Olympic water polo player.
Kåre Langvik-Johannessen, 95, Norwegian philologist, literary historian and translator.
Charles McCullough, 91, Northern Irish politician, member of the Senate (1968–1972).
Ian Monro, 87, New Zealand naval officer (HMNZS Lachlan).
Chris Nance, 74, American conductor. 
William Orchard, 84, Australian Olympic water polo player and psychiatrist.
Dan Peters, 60, American college basketball coach (Youngstown State), pancreatic cancer.
Lucio Sangermano, 82, Italian Olympic sprinter.
*Shin Hae-chul, 46, South Korean pop singer (N.EX.T), heart attack.
Leif Skiöld, 79, Swedish footballer and ice hockey player.
Richard Stretch, 61, South African cricketer.
Reidar Sundby, 88, Norwegian footballer (Larvik Turn).
Starke Taylor, 92, American politician, Mayor of Dallas (1983–1987).
Dub Williams, 87, American politician, member of the New Mexico House of Representatives (1995–2009).

28
Ronald Norman Dalby, 85, Canadian engineer and academic administrator, Chancellor of the University of Alberta (1974–1978).
Romualdas Granauskas, 75, Lithuanian writer.
Mansour Hobeika, 72, Lebanese Maronite Catholic prelate, Bishop of Zahlé (since 2002).
Koichiro Kimura, 44, Japanese mixed martial artist and professional wrestler, pneumonia.
Galway Kinnell, 87, American poet, Pulitzer Prize winner, leukemia.
James William Lair, 90, American CIA case officer.
Nedo Logli, 91, Italian cyclist.
John Ross Mackay, 98, Canadian geographer.
Jim Paxson, Sr., 81, American basketball player (Minneapolis Lakers, Cincinnati Royals).
Michael Sata, 77, Zambian politician, President (since 2011), heart attack.
Hans Schneider, 87, Austrian-born American mathematician and journal editor (Linear Algebra and its Applications), cancer.
Clark S. Smith, 102, American politician.
David Trendell, 50, British organist and musical director.
Carroll Waller, 87, American historic preservationist, First Lady of Mississippi (1972–1976), restored the Mississippi Governor's Mansion, Alzheimer's disease.
Charlie Watkins, 91, British audio engineer (Watkins Electric Music).

29
Alfred Biehle, 87, German politician.
Don Bracken, 52, American football player (Green Bay Packers, Los Angeles Rams), staph infection.
Alan Dawson, 82, Australian rules footballer.
Frans De Bruyn, 90, Belgian Flemish writer.
Frank Domínguez, 87, Cuban composer and pianist.
Dennis Duncan, 71, Canadian football player, Parkinson's disease.
Thomas Dupuy, 32, French boxer, killed.
Roger Freeman, 48, American politician, member of the Washington House of Representatives, colon cancer.
Rainer Hasler, 56, Liechtenstein footballer. (death announced on this date)
Roderick M. Hills, 83, American lawyer and business executive, Chairman of the Securities and Exchange Commission (1975–1977), surgical complications.
Klas Ingesson, 46, Swedish footballer (national team), multiple myeloma.
Mary Jolliffe, 90, Canadian theatre publicist.
H. Gary Morse, 77, American real estate developer (The Villages, Florida).
Rosa Posada, 74, Spanish politician.

30
Elijah Malok Aleng, 77, South Sudanese public servant.
Renée Asherson, 99, English actress (Caesar and Cleopatra, Henry V, The Others).
Joe Brown, 85, English football player and manager (Burnley).
Geoffrey Clarke, 89, British artist.
Xavier de Villepin, 88, French politician.
Harcourt Dowsley, 95, Australian cricketer and football player.
Juan Flavier, 79, Filipino politician, Secretary of Health (1992–1995), member of the Senate (1995–2007), multiple organ failure.
John Forzani, 67, Canadian businessman and football player, heart attack.
Bob Geigel, 90, American professional wrestler and promoter (Central States Wrestling), Alzheimer's disease.
Max Homer, 79, American politician, member of the Pennsylvania House of Representatives (1969–1974).
Mohamed Sheikh Ismail, 50s, Somali military commander, Chief of the Police Force (2014).
Amin Kamil, 90, Indian poet.
Thomas Menino, 71, American politician, Mayor of Boston (1993–2014), cancer.
Andy Natowich, 95, American football player.
Ida Elizabeth Osbourne, 98, Australian radio broadcaster, founder of the ABC's Argonauts Club.
Clay Stapleton, 93, American football player and coach (Iowa State Cyclones).
Christopher J. Turner, 81, British diplomat, Governor of the Turks and Caicos Islands (1982–1987) and Montserrat (1987–1990).

31
David Manker Abshire, 88, American diplomat, Permanent Representative to NATO (1983–1987).
Michael Alsbury, 39, American test pilot and engineer (Scaled Composites), spaceplane crash.
Aden Robleh Awaleh, 72–73,  Djiboutian politician.
Tony Blake, 87, English footballer.
José Manuel Briceño Guerrero, 85, Venezuelan writer, philologist and philosopher.
Marina Cárdenas, 67, Nicaraguan bolero singer.
Armando Cavazzuti, 85, Italian footballer.
Ciguli, 57, Bulgarian Chalga singer.
Carlos Duque, 84, Panamanian politician.
Ian Fraser, 81, English composer and conductor (Scrooge, Christmas in Washington), cancer.
Brad Halsey, 33, American baseball player (Oakland Athletics), climbing fall.
Sir Henry Harris, 89, Australian cell biologist.
Käbi Laretei, 92, Estonian concert pianist.
Mal MacDougall, 86, American advertising executive and speechwriter.
Hitoshi Motoshima, 92, Japanese politician, Mayor of Nagasaki (1979–1995).
Sofron Mudry, 90, Ukrainian Greek Catholic hierarch, Bishop of Ivano-Frankivsk (1997–2005).
Walter H. North, 81, American politician, member of the Michigan Senate (1995–2002).
Pat Partridge, 81, British football referee.
Jim Sauter, 71, American stock car racing driver.
Bibbi Segerström, 71, Swedish Olympic swimmer (1960).
Renato Sellani, 88, Italian jazz pianist and composer.
John V. Shields, 82, American chief executive (Trader Joe's).
Ross H. Trower, 92, American naval officer, Chief of Chaplains of the United States Navy (1979–1983).

References

2014-10
 10